The multiverse is a hypothetical group of multiple universes. Together, these universes are presumed to comprise everything that exists: the entirety of space, time, matter, energy, information, and the physical laws and constants that describe them. The different universes within the multiverse are called "parallel universes", "other universes", "alternate universes", or "many worlds". One common assumption is that the multiverse is a "patchwork quilt of separate universes all bound by the same laws of physics."

History of the concept 
According to some, the idea of infinite worlds was first suggested by the pre-Socratic Greek philosopher Anaximander in the sixth century BCE. However, there is debate as to whether he believed in multiple worlds, and if he did, whether those worlds were co-existent or successive.

The first to whom we can definitively attribute the concept of innumerable worlds are the Ancient Greek Atomists, beginning with Leucippus and Democritus in the 5th century BCE, followed by Epicurus (341-270 BCE) and Lucretius (1st century BCE). In the third century BCE, the philosopher Chrysippus suggested that the world eternally expired and regenerated, effectively suggesting the existence of multiple universes across time. The concept of multiple universes became more defined in the Middle Ages.

The American philosopher and psychologist William James used the term "multiverse" in 1895, but in a different context.

The concept first appeared in the modern scientific context in the course of the debate between Boltzmann and Zermelo in 1895.

In Dublin in 1952, Erwin Schrödinger gave a lecture in which he jocularly warned his audience that what he was about to say might "seem lunatic". He said that when his equations seemed to describe several different histories, these were "not alternatives, but all really happen simultaneously". This sort of duality is called "superposition".

In his 1930 autobiography My Early Life, Winston Churchill cited the theory when explaining his preference for "believing whatever I want to believe": 

The term was first used in fiction in September 1961 in the DC comic book titled Flash of Two Worlds (Flash Volume 1 #123) by Carmine Infantino and Gardner Fox. In the story, Flash meets with his duplicate version of another Earth (Earth-2) and another Flash (Flash-2).

The term was first used in fiction in its current physics context by Michael Moorcock in his 1963 SF Adventures novella The Sundered Worlds (part of his Eternal Champion series). (see Multiverse (Michael Moorcock))

Brief explanation 
Multiple universes have been hypothesized in cosmology, physics, astronomy, religion, philosophy, transpersonal psychology, music, and all kinds of literature, particularly in science fiction, comic books and fantasy. In these contexts, parallel universes are also called "alternate universes", "quantum universes", "interpenetrating dimensions", "parallel universes", "parallel dimensions", "parallel worlds", "parallel realities", "quantum realities", "alternate realities", "alternate timelines", "alternate dimensions" and "dimensional planes".

The physics community has debated the various multiverse theories over time. Prominent physicists are divided about whether any other universes exist outside of our own.

Some physicists say the multiverse is not a legitimate topic of scientific inquiry. Concerns have been raised about whether attempts to exempt the multiverse from experimental verification could erode public confidence in science and ultimately damage the study of fundamental physics. Some have argued that the multiverse is a philosophical notion rather than a scientific hypothesis because it cannot be empirically falsified. The ability to disprove a theory by means of scientific experiment is a critical criterion of the accepted scientific method. Paul Steinhardt has famously argued that no experiment can rule out a theory if the theory provides for all possible outcomes.

In 2007, Nobel laureate Steven Weinberg suggested that if the multiverse existed, "the hope of finding a rational explanation for the precise values of quark masses and other constants of the standard model that we observe in our Big Bang is doomed, for their values would be an accident of the particular part of the multiverse in which we live."

Search for evidence 
Around 2010, scientists such as Stephen M. Feeney analyzed Wilkinson Microwave Anisotropy Probe (WMAP) data and claimed to find evidence suggesting that this universe collided with other (parallel) universes in the distant past. However, a more thorough analysis of data from the WMAP and from the Planck satellite, which has a resolution three times higher than WMAP, did not reveal any statistically significant evidence of such a bubble universe collision. In addition, there was no evidence of any gravitational pull of other universes on ours.

Proponents and skeptics 
Modern proponents of one or more of the multiverse hypotheses include Don Page, Brian Greene, Max Tegmark, Alan Guth, Andrei Linde, Michio Kaku, David Deutsch, Leonard Susskind, Alexander Vilenkin, Yasunori Nomura, Raj Pathria, Laura Mersini-Houghton, Neil deGrasse Tyson,  Sean Carroll and Stephen Hawking.

Scientists who are generally skeptical of the multiverse hypothesis include David Gross, Paul Steinhardt, Anna Ijjas, Abraham Loeb, David Spergel, Neil Turok, Viatcheslav Mukhanov, Michael S. Turner, Roger Penrose, George Ellis, Joe Silk,
Carlo Rovelli, Adam Frank, Marcelo Gleiser, Jim Baggott and Paul Davies.

Arguments against multiverse hypotheses 
In his 2003 New York Times opinion piece, "A Brief History of the Multiverse", author and cosmologist Paul Davies offered a variety of arguments that multiverse hypotheses are non-scientific: 

George Ellis, writing in August 2011, provided a criticism of the multiverse, and pointed out that it is not a traditional scientific theory. He accepts that the multiverse is thought to exist far beyond the cosmological horizon. He emphasized that it is theorized to be so far away that it is unlikely any evidence will ever be found. Ellis also explained that some theorists do not believe the lack of empirical testability and  falsifiability is a major concern, but he is opposed to that line of thinking: 

Ellis says that scientists have proposed the idea of the multiverse as a way of explaining the nature of existence. He points out that it ultimately leaves those questions unresolved because it is a metaphysical issue that cannot be resolved by empirical science. He argues that observational testing is at the core of science and should not be abandoned: 

Philosopher Philip Goff argues that the inference of a multiverse to explain the apparent fine-tuning of the universe is an example of Inverse Gambler's Fallacy.

Stoeger, Ellis, and Kircher note that in a true multiverse theory, "the universes are then completely disjoint and nothing that happens in any one of them is causally linked to what happens in any other one. This lack of any causal connection in such multiverses really places them beyond any scientific support".

Types 
Max Tegmark and Brian Greene have devised classification schemes for the various theoretical types of multiverses and universes that they might comprise.

Max Tegmark's four levels 

Cosmologist Max Tegmark has provided a taxonomy of universes beyond the familiar observable universe. The four levels of Tegmark's classification are arranged such that subsequent levels can be understood to encompass and expand upon previous levels. They are briefly described below.

Level I: An extension of our universe 
A prediction of cosmic inflation is the existence of an infinite ergodic universe, which, being infinite, must contain Hubble volumes realizing all initial conditions.

Accordingly, an infinite universe will contain an infinite number of Hubble volumes, all having the same physical laws and physical constants. In regard to configurations such as the distribution of matter, almost all will differ from our Hubble volume. However, because there are infinitely many, far beyond the cosmological horizon, there will eventually be Hubble volumes with similar, and even identical, configurations. Tegmark estimates that an identical volume to ours should be about 1010115 meters away from us.

Given infinite space, there would, in fact, be an infinite number of Hubble volumes identical to ours in the universe. This follows directly from the cosmological principle, wherein it is assumed that our Hubble volume is not special or unique.

Level II: Universes with different physical constants 

In the eternal inflation theory, which is a variant of the cosmic inflation theory, the multiverse or space as a whole is stretching and will continue doing so forever, but some regions of space stop stretching and form distinct bubbles (like gas pockets in a loaf of rising bread). Such bubbles are embryonic level I multiverses.

Different bubbles may experience different spontaneous symmetry breaking, which results in different properties, such as different physical constants.

Level II also includes John Archibald Wheeler's oscillatory universe theory and Lee Smolin's fecund universes theory.

Level III: Many-worlds interpretation of quantum mechanics 
Hugh Everett III's many-worlds interpretation (MWI) is one of several mainstream interpretations of quantum mechanics.

In brief, one aspect of quantum mechanics is that certain observations cannot be predicted absolutely. Instead, there is a range of possible observations, each with a different probability. According to the MWI, each of these possible observations corresponds to a different universe, with some or many of the interpretation's proponents suggesting that these universes are as real as ours. Suppose a six-sided die is thrown and that the result of the throw corresponds to quantum mechanics observable. All six possible ways the dice can fall correspond to six different universes. In the case of the Schrödinger's cat thought experiment, both outcomes would be "real" in at least one "world".

Tegmark argues that a Level III multiverse does not contain more possibilities in the Hubble volume than a Level I or Level II multiverse. In effect, all the different "worlds" created by "splits" in a Level III multiverse with the same physical constants can be found in some Hubble volume in a Level I multiverse. Tegmark writes that, "The only difference between Level I and Level III is where your doppelgängers reside. In Level I they live elsewhere in good old three-dimensional space. In Level III they live on another quantum branch in infinite-dimensional Hilbert space."

Similarly, all Level II bubble universes with different physical constants can, in effect, be found as "worlds" created by "splits" at the moment of spontaneous symmetry breaking in a Level III multiverse. According to Yasunori Nomura, Raphael Bousso, and Leonard Susskind, this is because global spacetime appearing in the (eternally) inflating multiverse is a redundant concept. This implies that the multiverses of Levels I, II, and III are, in fact, the same thing. This hypothesis is referred to as "Multiverse = Quantum Many Worlds". According to Yasunori Nomura, this quantum multiverse is static, and time is a simple illusion.

Another version of the many-worlds idea is H. Dieter Zeh's many-minds interpretation.

Level IV: Ultimate ensemble 
The ultimate mathematical universe hypothesis is Tegmark's own hypothesis.

This level considers all universes to be equally real which can be described by different mathematical structures.

Tegmark writes: 

He argues that this "implies that any conceivable parallel universe theory can be described at Level IV" and "subsumes all other ensembles, therefore brings closure to the hierarchy of multiverses, and there cannot be, say, a Level V."

Jürgen Schmidhuber, however, says that the set of mathematical structures is not even well-defined and that it admits only universe representations describable by constructive mathematics—that is, computer programs.

Schmidhuber explicitly includes universe representations describable by non-halting programs whose output bits converge after a finite time, although the convergence time itself may not be predictable by a halting program, due to the undecidability of the halting problem. He also explicitly discusses the more restricted ensemble of quickly computable universes.

Brian Greene's nine types 

The American theoretical physicist and string theorist Brian Greene discussed nine types of multiverses:

Quilted
The quilted multiverse works only in an infinite universe. With an infinite amount of space, every possible event will occur an infinite number of times. However, the speed of light prevents us from being aware of these other identical areas.

Inflationary
The inflationary multiverse is composed of various pockets in which inflation fields collapse and form new universes.

Brane
The brane multiverse version postulates that our entire universe exists on a membrane (brane) which floats in a higher dimension or "bulk". In this bulk, there are other membranes with their own universes. These universes can interact with one another, and when they collide, the violence and energy produced is more than enough to give rise to a big bang. The branes float or drift near each other in the bulk, and every few trillion years, attracted by gravity or some other force we do not understand, collide and bang into each other. This repeated contact gives rise to multiple or "cyclic" big bangs. This particular hypothesis falls under the string theory umbrella as it requires extra spatial dimensions.

Cyclic
The cyclic multiverse has multiple branes that have collided, causing Big Bangs. The universes bounce back and pass through time until they are pulled back together and again collide, destroying the old contents and creating them anew.

Landscape
The landscape multiverse relies on string theory's Calabi–Yau spaces. Quantum fluctuations drop the shapes to a lower energy level, creating a pocket with a set of laws different from that of the surrounding space.

Quantum
The quantum multiverse creates a new universe when a diversion in events occurs, as in the real-worlds variant of the many-worlds interpretation of quantum mechanics.

Holographic
The holographic multiverse is derived from the theory that the surface area of a space can encode the contents of the volume of the region.

Simulated
The simulated multiverse exists on complex computer systems that simulate entire universes. A related hypothesis, as put forward as a possibility by astronomer Avi Loeb, is that universes may be creatable in laboratories of advanced technological civilizations who have a theory of everything. Other related hypotheses include brain in a vat-type scenarios where the perceived universe is either simulated in a low-resource way or not perceived directly by the virtual/simulated inhabitant species.

Ultimate
The ultimate multiverse contains every mathematically possible universe under different laws of physics.

Twin-world models 

There are models of two related universes that e.g. attempt to explain the baryon asymmetry – why there was more matter than antimatter at the beginning – with a mirror anti-universe. One two-universe cosmological model could explain the Hubble constant (H0) tension via interactions between the two worlds. The "mirror world" would contain copies of all existing fundamental particles. Another twin/pair-world or "bi-world" cosmology is shown to theoretically be able to solve the cosmological constant (Λ) problem, closely related to dark energy: two interacting worlds with a large Λ each could result in a small shared effective Λ.

Cyclic theories 

In several theories, there is a series of, in some cases infinite, self-sustaining cycles – typically a series of Big Crunches (or Big Bounces). However, the respective universes do not exist at once but are sequential, with key natural constituents potentially varying between universes (see § Anthropic principle).

M-theory 

A multiverse of a somewhat different kind has been envisaged within string theory and its higher-dimensional extension, M-theory.

These theories require the presence of 10 or 11 spacetime dimensions respectively. The extra six or seven dimensions may either be compactified on a very small scale, or our universe may simply be localized on a dynamical (3+1)-dimensional object, a D3-brane. This opens up the possibility that there are other branes which could support other universes.

Black-hole cosmology 

Black-hole cosmology is a cosmological model in which the observable universe is the interior of a black hole existing as one of possibly many universes inside a larger universe. This includes the theory of white holes, which are on the opposite side of space-time.

Anthropic principle 

The concept of other universes has been proposed to explain how our own universe appears to be fine-tuned for conscious life as we experience it.

If there were a large (possibly infinite) number of universes, each with possibly different physical laws (or different fundamental physical constants), then some of these universes (even if very few) would have the combination of laws and fundamental parameters that are suitable for the development of matter, astronomical structures, elemental diversity, stars, and planets that can exist long enough for life to emerge and evolve.

The weak anthropic principle could then be applied to conclude that we (as conscious beings) would only exist in one of those few universes that happened to be finely tuned, permitting the existence of life with developed consciousness. Thus, while the probability might be extremely small that any particular universe would have the requisite conditions for life (as we understand life), those conditions do not require intelligent design as an explanation for the conditions in the Universe that promote our existence in it.

An early form of this reasoning is evident in Arthur Schopenhauer's 1844 work "Von der Nichtigkeit und dem Leiden des Lebens", where he argues that our world must be the worst of all possible worlds, because if it were significantly worse in any respect it could not continue to exist.

Occam's razor 
Proponents and critics disagree about how to apply Occam's razor. Critics argue that to postulate an almost infinite number of unobservable universes, just to explain our own universe, is contrary to Occam's razor. However, proponents argue that in terms of Kolmogorov complexity the proposed multiverse is simpler than a single idiosyncratic universe.

For example, multiverse proponent Max Tegmark argues:

Possible worlds and real worlds 
In any given set of possible universes – e.g. in terms of histories or variables of nature – not all may be ever realized, and some may be realized many times. For example, over infinite time there could, in some potential theories, be infinite universes, but only a small or relatively small real number of universes where humanity could exist and only one where it ever does exist (with a unique history). It has been suggested that a universe that "contains life, in the form it has on Earth, is in a certain sense radically non-ergodic, in that the vast majority of possible organisms will never be realized". On the other hand, some scientists, theories and popular works conceive of a multiverse in which the universes are so similar that humanity exists in many equally real separate universes but with varying histories.

There is a debate about whether the other worlds are real in the many-worlds interpretation (MWI) of quantum mechanics. In Quantum Darwinism one does not need to adopt a MWI in which all of the branches are equally real.

Modal realism 
Possible worlds are a way of explaining probability and hypothetical statements. Some philosophers, such as David Lewis, posit that all possible worlds exist and that they are just as real as the world we live in. This position is known as modal realism.

See also 

 Beyond black holes
 Cosmogony
 Impossible world
 Measure problem (cosmology)
 Modal realism
 Parallel universes in fiction
 Philosophy of physics
 Philosophy of space and time
 Simulated reality
 Twin Earth thought experiment
 Ultimate fate of the universe

References 
Footnotes

Citations

Further reading 

 
 
 
 Andrei Linde, The Self-Reproducing Inflationary Universe, Scientific American, November 1994 - Touches on multiverse concepts at the end of the article

External links 

 Interview with Tufts cosmologist Alex Vilenkin on his new book, "Many Worlds in One: The Search for Other Universes" on the podcast and public radio interview program ThoughtCast. 
 Multiverse – an episode of the series In Our Time with Melvyn Bragg, on BBC Radio 4.
 Why There Might be Many More Universes Besides Our Own, by Phillip Ball, March 21, 2016, bbc.com.

 
Physical cosmology
Science fiction themes
Quantum mechanics
Astronomical hypotheses
Anthropic principle
Hypothetical astronomical objects